"Skinny Little Bitch" is a song by the American alternative rock band Hole. It is the second track and lead single from the band's fourth studio album, Nobody's Daughter, and was released on March 12, 2010 on Mercury Records. Written by vocalist Courtney Love and lead guitarist Micko Larkin, "Skinny Little Bitch" was Hole's first single in a decade and first release not to feature founding member Eric Erlandson.

The song premiered on the New York radio station WRXP on March 3, 2010 and was released to American radio on March 9. During the first week of its radio release, the song became the most added on alternative radio and the second most added on active rock in the United States. A digital download of the single was officially made available on March 12 and a limited edition colored 10" was released as part of Record Store Day 2010 on April 17.

Two official music videos for "Skinny Little Bitch" have been released on Hole's official YouTube channel—a multi-camera version of the band's performance at SXSW in March 2010 and a shortened video of Love performing the song while getting a tattoo. Other plans for a music video, including an animation by Michael Mouris and a video featuring model Sasha Pivovarova, were considered but never received a greenlight from Mercury Records.

"Skinny Little Bitch" was added to the US Active Rock Charts at #32 making it the first song with lead vocals from a female to ever make the chart.

Release and reception
The track was described by NME as,
"a balls-out, low-down dirty rock song, and as fine a signature tune for the new Hole as you could imagine. Tapping the same lyrical vein as 'Samantha', it's The Stooges fronted by a Joan Jett re-imagined as the Bride Of Frankenstein. And it’s the sound of Courtney having fun."

Promotion
"Skinny Little Bitch" was debuted live during Hole's reunion show at London's O2 Shepherd's Bush Empire on 17 February 2010. It was also played during two other European dates at Milan's Magazzini Generali, and Amsterdam's Paradiso on 19 February and 21 February 2010 respectively. On February 24, it was played alongside "Samantha" at the NME Awards at London's O2 Academy Brixton. The song was heard on an episode of Warehouse 13.

Music video

Talking about the music video, Love stated, "there will be a stunning video for SLB as long as the only model that you will all fall in love w that the band needs does it!." She later revealed the model to be Sasha Pivovarova, chosen because "shes the only look that can convey what the SLB goes through a lot of self torture."

However, Love has since stated that Mert and Marcus will direct the music video provided that Mercury greenlights the project, while also stating again that Sasha Pivovarova will take on the role of the "Skinny Little Bitch."

On 7 April 2010, Hole's official YouTube channel released a multicamera mix of Hole's performance of "Skinny Little Bitch" at the SXSW music festival. The performance is overdubbed with the single version of the song. Less than three weeks later, on 27 April, Hole released "the least expensive Courtney Love video ever", directed by Casey Neistat. It features Love singing "Skinny Little Bitch" while getting a tattoo and is less than two minutes in length.

Track listing and formats
Digital download
"Skinny Little Bitch" – 3:09

US 10" single (B0014258-11)
"Skinny Little Bitch" – 3:09
"Codine" – 3:57

Personnel
All personnel credits adapted from Nobody's Daughters liner notes.

Hole
Courtney Love –  vocals, composition, writing
Micko Larkin - guitar, composition
Shawn Dailey – bass
Stu Fisher – drums

Guest musician
Jack Irons – drums

Technical personnel
Michael Beinhorn – producer
Owen Lewis – assistant producer
Karl Egsieker – engineer
Nico Essig – additional engineer
Tom Syrowski – additional engineer
John O'Mahoney – mixing

Chart positions

Release history

References

2010 singles
Hole (band) songs
Songs written by Courtney Love
Songs written by Micko Larkin
Song recordings produced by Michael Beinhorn
2010 songs
Mercury Records singles